was the 3rd daimyō of Kuroishi Domain in northern Mutsu Province, Honshū, Japan (modern-day Aomori Prefecture). His courtesy title was Izumo-no-kami, and his Court rank was Junior Fifth Rank, Lower Grade.

Biography
Tsugaru Tsuguyasu was the 2nd son of Tsugaru Chikatari, the 1st daimyō of Kuroishi Domain and was originally named Tsugaru Masatari . He became daimyō in 1839, when his adoptive elder brother Tsugaru Yukitsugu was reassigned to take over the administration of Hirosaki Domain, changing his name to Tsugaru Tsuguyasu at that time.

Tsuguyasu inherited a domain stabilized by the reforms his brother had begun to implement, and had a stable reign through the difficult the political and agricultural crises of the Tenpō era. He died in 1851 at a relatively young age. His grave is at the clan temple of Shinryō-in (a subsidiary of Kan'ei-ji) in Taitō-ku, Tokyo.

See also
Tsugaru clan

References
Koyasu Nobushige (1880). Buke kazoku meiyoden 武家家族名誉伝 Volume 1. Tokyo: Koyasu Nobushige. (Accessed from National Diet Library, 17 July 2008)
 Kurotaki, Jūjirō (1984). Tsugaru-han no hanzai to keibatsu 津軽藩の犯罪と刑罰. Hirosaki: Hoppō shinsha.
 Narita, Suegorō (1975). Tsugaru Tamenobu: shidan 津軽為信: 史談. Aomori: Tōō Nippōsha.
 Tsugaru Tsuguakira Kō Den kankōkai (1976). Tsugaru Tsuguakira kō-den 津輕承昭公傳. Tokyo: Rekishi Toshosha
 The content of much of this article was derived from that of the corresponding article on Japanese Wikipedia.

External links
 "Hirosaki-jō" (17 February 2008)
 "Tsugaru-han" on Edo 300 HTML (17 February 2008)

|-

Tozama daimyo
Tsugaru clan
1821 births
1851 deaths
People of Edo-period Japan